The Newlyn School was an art colony of artists based in or near Newlyn, a fishing village adjacent to Penzance, on the south coast of Cornwall, from the 1880s until the early twentieth century.  The establishment of the Newlyn School was reminiscent of the Barbizon School in France, where artists fled Paris to paint in a more pure setting emphasising natural light.  These schools along with a related California movement were also known as En plein air.

Some of the first British artists to settle in the area had already travelled in Brittany, but found in Newlyn a comparable English environment with a number of things guaranteed to attract them: fantastic light, cheap living, and the availability of inexpensive models. The artists were fascinated by the fishermen's working life at sea and the everyday life in the harbour and nearby villages. Some paintings showed the hazards and tragedy of the community's life, such as women anxiously looking out to sea as the boats go out, or a young woman crying on hearing news of a disaster. Walter Langley is generally recognised as the pioneer of the Newlyn art colony and Stanhope Forbes, who settled there in 1884, as the father of it. The later Forbes School of Painting, founded by Forbes and his wife Elizabeth in 1899, promoted the study of figure painting. A present-day Newlyn School of Art was formed in 2011 with Arts Council funding providing art courses taught by many of the best-known artists working in Cornwall today.

In the late nineteenth and early twentieth centuries, Lamorna, a nearby fishing village to the south, became popular with artists of the Newlyn School and is particularly associated with the artist S. J. "Lamorna" Birch who lived there from 1908.

Member artists
Newlyn School painters include:

Lamorna Birch
Frank Bramley
Marjorie Frances Bruford
Elizabeth Forbes
Stanhope Forbes
Norman Garstin
Caroline Gotch
Thomas Cooper Gotch
Frederick Hall
Edwin Harris
Gertrude Harvey
Harold Harvey
Eleanor Hughes
Ayerst Ingram
Mary Jewels
Harold Knight
Laura Knight
Walter Langley
Carey Morris
Alfred Munnings
Dod Procter
Charles Simpson
Ruth Simpson
Albert Chevallier Tayler
Henry Scott Tuke
Annie Walke née Fearon

For a full list see: George Bednar. Every Corner was a Picture: A checklist compiled for the West Cornwall Art Archive of 50 artists from the early Newlyn School painters through to the present.

See also

Staithes group

External links
 
Newlyn School (Encyclopedia of Irish and World Art)
Newlyn artists (The Lamorna Society)

Cornish culture
19th century in the United Kingdom
English artist groups and collectives
 
Newlyn
Victorian era
Artist colonies